Stephan Campbell (born August 26, 1990 in San Fernando) is a Trinidadian footballer.

Career

Club
Campbell attended Presentation College in his native Trinidad, and turned professional in 2009 when he signed for United Petrotrin of the TT Pro League. He scored three goals for United Petrotrin in the 2009 season.

Campbell moved to the United States in 2010 and signed with the Austin Aztex of the USSF Division 2. He made his debut for the team on May 1, 2010, in a 2-1 victory over the NSC Minnesota Stars. In October 2010 signed for Orlando City Soccer Club and played until march 2011 to his release, three games for the club.

International
Campbell has represented Trinidad and Tobago at various youth levels, ranging from U-17 to U-23. He was a member of the Trinidad team that participated in the 2007 FIFA U-17 World Cup, where he scored his country's lone goal in the competition.

References

1990 births
Living people
Trinidad and Tobago footballers
United Petrotrin F.C. players
Austin Aztex FC players
USSF Division 2 Professional League players
TT Pro League players
Association football midfielders